The C-Lark is an American sailboat, that was designed by Don Clark and first built in 1964.

Production
The design was built by the Clark Boat Company in Kent, Washington, United States starting in 1964 and also by Douglass & McLeod. Production ended in 1979. During its 15-year production run 1400 examples of the design were completed.

Design
The C-Lark is a recreational dinghy, built predominantly of fiberglass. It has a fractional sloop rig, a plumb stem, a vertical transom, a transom-hung rudder controlled by a tiller and a retractable centerboard keel. It displaces .

See also
List of sailing boat types

Similar sailboats
Albacore
Flying Junior
Laser 2
Snipe

References

Dinghies
1960s sailboat type designs
Sailboat type designs by Don Clark
Sailboat types built by Clark Boat Company
Sailboat types built by Douglass & McLeod